The Strange Thing About the Johnsons is a 2011 American psychological horror-drama short film written and directed by Ari Aster. The film stars Billy Mayo, Brandon Greenhouse, and Angela Bullock as members of a suburban family in which the son is involved in an abusive incestuous relationship with the family patriarch.

The short was Aster's thesis film while studying at the American Film Institute's graduate school in California, and later screened at film festivals in 2011, premiering at the Slamdance Film Festival in Utah on January 22, before it leaked online in November and went viral. Aster conceived the story while discussing taboos with his friends, including Greenhouse, before his first year at AFI. He worked on the production with fellow students from the school.

Plot
In 1995, Sidney Johnson, an acclaimed poet, accidentally interrupts his twelve-year-old son, Isaiah, masturbating. Sidney apologizes and reassures his son that the act is natural, unaware that Isaiah was masturbating to a photograph of him as a young man.
 
In 2009, during Isaiah's wedding reception, the matriarch of the Johnson family, Joan, discovers her son in a secluded part of the backyard performing fellatio on a distressed-looking Sidney. However, despite the disturbing act she witnesses, Joan merely takes a moment in order to regain her composure before continuing on with the party as if nothing has happened.

Later that day, while Joan's in the shower, Sidney leaves a typed memoir underneath her pillow called Cocoon Man: Confessions by Sidney Johnson, in which he chronicles the years of sexual abuse he's endured at the hands of their son. Unfortunately, Isaiah ends up discovering the memoir before Joan can see it and confronts Sidney in his study later that night, telling him that he'll be destroying it and warns him not to print any more copies.
 
Sometime later, while Sidney is listening to a self-help tape in the bath, Isaiah breaks down the locked door and rapes him before telling him to "put that in his book" afterwards. Meanwhile, in the bedroom, Joan hears the struggle through the walls but does nothing to stop it; instead, choosing to drown it out by raising the volume on the television.

The next day, Sidney removes a secret copy of "Cocoon Man" from underneath the floorboards and attempts to leave the house with it, leading to another confrontation with Isaiah who scolds him and says that he's just as guilty as he is before trying to persuade him into giving up the memoir. However, an emotionally distraught Sidney merely runs out of the house and into the street only to be struck and killed by an oncoming van.

After Sidney's funeral, a grief-stricken Joan finally decides to confront Isaiah, asking him about what happened 10 years ago during his prom night which caused his father to lock himself in the bathroom and cry for hours. Trying to dodge the question, Isaiah says that he doesn't remember but Joan asks if that's when "all this" started.

Isaiah tries to convince Joan that she's being delusional, but she merely laughs before asking how he could kill his own father, causing him to lash out physically and claim that he "loved him better than she ever did" which causes their argument to escalate into a full-on fight to the death.

During the struggle Joan scratches Isaiah's face which causes him to throw her across the room and attempt to strangle her, only for Joan to stab him with a nearby knife in self-defense. Enraged, he kicks her in the stomach before trying to force her headfirst into a lit fireplace. Luckily for her, a fire iron allows Joan to escape from Isaiah's clutches and kill him in a state of grief and rage.

Having lost her family, an utterly distraught Joan throws the last copy of Cocoon Man into the fire as the credits roll.

Cast
 Billy Mayo as Sidney
 Brandon Greenhouse as Isaiah
 Carlon Jeffery as Young Isaiah
 Angela Bullock as Joan
 Stanley Bennett Clay as Howard
 Connie Jackson as Grace
 Danièle Watts as Marianne

Production
The team began work on the project during Aster's time at the American Film Institute's graduate school, AFI Conservatory, for his thesis film. The idea behind the short had arisen from a discussion with some friends about taboo topics, during the summer preceding his first year at AFI. Brandon Greenhouse, who plays Isaiah, had previously worked on projects with Aster and was there since conception.

The short was shot on 35mm film. He described the script as being "a bit of an uphill battle to make it there politically", stating:

Reception
After the short film was released online, it went viral, garnering a polarized reaction due to its controversial themes. Ivan Kander of the website Short of the Week wrote that the comments on YouTube had "everything from effusive acclaim to disgusted vitriol. In terms of the internet, that means it's a hit."

The film also garnered controversy for its portrayal of an African American family by a Jewish filmmaker. Director Ari Aster stated that "the color of the family isn't important. We certainly assumed that casting black actors in a film that tackles such transgressive themes would create something of a stir, and it would be a lie to say that we weren't hesitant, especially as many people were advising us against the decision."

As an African American incest and child sexual abuse survivor, Malcolm Harris of The Huffington Post wrote that Billy Mayo's performance was "brilliant" and that "we should be applauding the fact that someone has finally shown true courage in proposing the question, 'What If? What if these strange events were happening behind the closed doors of the Smiths, the Rosenbergs, the Mortimers, the Herreras? What if these strange things were happening to me?'"

References

External links

2011 independent films
2011 short films
2011 films
American horror short films
American independent films
Viral videos
Incest in film
2011 drama films
American drama films
2011 horror films
Films directed by Ari Aster
Filicide in fiction
2010s English-language films
2010s American films